Hungerford is a town in Berkshire, England.

Hungerford may also refer to:

Places

Australia 
Hungerford, Queensland, an outback town in the Shire of Bulloo

Canada 
 Hungerford, Ontario, a settlement in the municipality of Tweed, Hastings County, Ontario

United Kingdom 
Hungerford, Berkshire
Hungerford railway station
Hungerford Rural District, 1894 to 1974
Hungerford, Waltham St Lawrence, a location in Berkshire
Hungerford, Hampshire, a hamlet
Hungerford, Shropshire, a location
Hungerford, Somerset, a location
Hungerford Newtown, a hamlet in Berkshire
Farleigh Hungerford, Somerset, a village

United States 
Hungerford, Texas
Hungerford Township, Plymouth County, Iowa

People 
 Hungerford (surname)
 Hungerford Crewe, 3rd Baron Crewe (1812–1894), English landowner and peer
 Hungerford Dunch (1639–1680), English MP for Cricklade
 Hungerford Hoskyns, several of the Hoskyns baronets

See also
Hungerford Bridge, a bridge over the Thames at London
Hungerford Market, a market at what is now Charing Cross Station, London
Hungerford massacre, a mass shooting in 1987 at Hungerford, Berkshire